Playa Camarones is a beach along Puerto Vallarta's 5 de Diciembre neighborhood, in the Mexican state of Jalisco.

References

Beaches of Jalisco
Puerto Vallarta